WFWA (channel 39) is a PBS member television station in Fort Wayne, Indiana, United States. Owned by Fort Wayne Public Television, Inc., the station maintains studios at the Dr. Rudy and Rhonda Kachmann Teleplex on the campus of Purdue University Fort Wayne, and its transmitter is located at its former studio facility on Butler Road in Fort Wayne.

History

On February 2, 1975, W39AA, a translator of WBGU-TV in Bowling Green, Ohio, signed on the air on channel 39; the coverage of W39AA was generally restricted to the immediate Fort Wayne area, as its coverage was not powerful enough to cover the entire market. This low-powered repeater station was merely a placeholder, as channel 39 was allocated as a full-powered educational channel in Fort Wayne. In December 1985, the station became a translator of Indianapolis PBS station WFYI, after the translator was allowed to originate programming.

In October 1984, Fort Wayne Public Television applied to build a full-power station on channel 39. The FCC approved on January 29, 1985; WFWA signed on the air on December 5, 1986, bringing northeast Indiana its own PBS station for the first time ever. However, it was not until October 1, 1989, that WFWA was programmed separately from WFYI.

In 2003, WFWA became the first television station in the Fort Wayne market to broadcast a digital signal, originally carrying the national PBS HDTV feed on a separate subchannel from its regular programming; funding issues would later cause the national HD feed to be pulled, leaving all programming in standard definition for several years. It was announced that WFWA's main channel 39.1 would broadcast in high-definition full-time at some point during summer 2010. During a summer 2010 pledge break, general manager Bruce Haines announced that the change would occur on July 4, 2010 at 7:30 p.m. Due to advancements in video compression, the station was able to upgrade its main channel to HD without sacrificing the video quality of its other three SD subchannels.

In May 2013, the station announced a fundraising drive to upgrade its infrastructure over the next three years, including a signal boost, the purchase of remote production equipment, and improvements to the station's master control.

Technical information

Subchannels
The station's digital signal is multiplexed:

Previously, WFWA had shown the national PBS Kids feed (also seen nationally on digital cable/satellite) on channel 39.2. When the service ended on September 26, 2005, WFWA continued the channel by self-programming it locally until 2017, when the national 24/7 PBS Kids Channel launched. WFWA aired the Annenberg/CPB Channel on 39.4 until October 1, 2008. The satellite feed for Annenberg was discontinued at that time.

Analog-to-digital conversion
WFWA shut down its analog signal, over UHF channel 39, on February 17, 2009, the original target date in which full-power television stations in the United States were to transition from analog to digital broadcasts under federal mandate (which was later pushed back to June 12, 2009). The station's digital signal remained on its pre-transition UHF channel 40. Through the use of PSIP, digital television receivers display the station's virtual channel as its former UHF analog channel 39.

As part of the SAFER Act, WFWA kept its analog signal on the air for 2+ weeks to inform viewers of the digital television transition through a loop of public service announcements from the National Association of Broadcasters.

References

External links
Official website

PBS member stations
Television channels and stations established in 1986
FWA
1986 establishments in Indiana